Óscar Rubio Fauria (born 14 May 1984) is a Spanish professional footballer who plays for Lleida Esportiu. On the right side of the field, he can operate as a defender or a midfielder.

Club career
Born in Lleida, Catalonia, Rubio spent most of his career in his native region, representing UE Tàrrega, UE Lleida, Gimnàstic de Tarragona and Elche CF. During that spell he played five seasons in the Segunda División, the exception being 2006–07 in the Segunda División B with the second club.

In summer 2010, aged 26, Rubio moved abroad and joined FC Dinamo București of Liga I, being released at the end of the campaign by the Romanian team and returning to his country with Deportivo Alavés (third division). In his second year he contributed 41 games – playoffs included – as the Basques returned to the second tier after a four-year absence.

Personal life
Rubio's father, Miguel Ángel Rubio, also played with Lleida, competing with the club in La Liga and later managing it.

References

External links

1984 births
Living people
Spanish footballers
Footballers from Catalonia
Association football defenders
Association football midfielders
Segunda División players
Segunda División B players
Primera Federación players
Segunda Federación players
UE Lleida players
UE Tàrrega players
Gimnàstic de Tarragona footballers
Elche CF players
Deportivo Alavés players
Cádiz CF players
Lleida Esportiu footballers
CE Sabadell FC footballers
Liga I players
FC Dinamo București players
Spanish expatriate footballers
Expatriate footballers in Romania
Spanish expatriate sportspeople in Romania